Vasile Nedelciuc (born November 13, 1948) is a politician from Chişinău, the Republic of Moldova. He served as the chairman of the Foreign Policy Committee of the Parliament of Moldova and the head of the Moldovan Delegation to Europe and vice president of the Parliamentary Assembly of the Council of Europe in Strasbourg. Vasile Nedelciuc is the chairman and co-founder of Endava Moldova (an international IT company). He holds a Ph.D. in computer science from the Moscow Aviation Institute.

References

External links 
 Vasile Nedelciuc: „ Nobody got in touch with me to ask me if I want to run for the presidential office”
 APCE - Vasile Nedelciuc
 Timpul, 6 octombrie 2005 - Vasile Nedelciuc: „Să facem totul ca Moldova să devină credibilă în Europa”

1948 births
Living people
Members of the parliament of Moldova